Günther Kleiber (16 September 1931, Eula – 29 March 2013, Berlin) was a former communist politician of the German Democratic Republic (GDR). He was a member of the politburo of the Socialist Unity Party of Germany (SED) from 1984 to 1989, and a member of the GDR government as minister for machinery, agricultural machinery and vehicle construction from 1973 to 1986. He was also a member of the SED central committee and the People's Chamber from 1967. He was Vice Chairman of the Council of Ministers from 1971 to 1989. From 1986 to 1989, he was the representative of the GDR to COMECON.

Kleiber resigned all his offices on 8 November 1989, the day before the fall of the Berlin Wall. He was expelled from the party on 3 December. An investigation into abuse of power and corruption was suspended in May 1990. After his release from custody, he was unemployed.

In 1997, Kleiber was convicted for his role in ordering border guards to shoot East Germans who were attempting to flee to the West, and sentenced to three years in prison. The verdict was upheld by the Federal Supreme Court in November 1999, and Kleiber reported to a prison in Berlin to begin serving his sentence on 18 January 2000. After a request for clemency, where he expressed his regret for his actions as a member of the East German regime, he was, along with Günter Schabowski, pardoned by Governing Mayor Eberhard Diepgen (CDU) and released from prison on 6 September the same year.

References

1931 births
2013 deaths
People from Borna
Members of the Politburo of the Central Committee of the Socialist Unity Party of Germany
Government ministers of East Germany
Members of the Volkskammer
Prisoners and detainees of Germany
German politicians convicted of crimes
Recipients of the Banner of Labor
German criminals